The Canon EOS DCS 3 was Kodak's second Canon based Digital SLR camera (a rebranded Kodak EOS-DCS 3) released in July 1995, four months after Kodak EOS-DCS 5. It uses a modified Canon EOS-1N film camera with a modified Kodak NC2000e digital camera back attached. As a result, it maintained the Canon EF lens mount, and full compatibility with all of Canon's EF lenses made until that time. The camera was followed by the six megapixel Canon EOS DCS 1, which was released later in December 1995.

The back had a then-massive 16MB of RAM to act as an image buffer, as well as a PCMCIA card slot for image storage, plus a SCSI socket for connection to a computer. The imaging element was an APS-C sensor with a 1.5x crop factor, and a resolution of 1268 x 1012 pixels (1.3 mp). The camera back did not have an LCD monitor.

A typical 260MB PCMCIA card or IBM Microdrive of the period could store 189 images. The EOS DCS 3 lacked any internal JPEG processing, and images had to be processed on a computer before they were usable in any form. The large amount of memory contributed to the then-immense price of the EOS DCS 3, at nearly two million yen.

The camera was succeeded by the Canon EOS D2000 (a rebranded Kodak DCS 520) in 1998.

See also
Kodak DCS

References

External links
Canon Camera Museum: Canon EOS DCS 3

Canon EOS DSLR cameras
Kodak DCS cameras
Products introduced in 1995